Melva Matucha Paredes Fischer (born 3 May 1968) is a Venezuelan politician, who is an alternate deputy to the National Assembly of Venezuela by the Aragua state.

See also 
 IV National Assembly of Venezuela

References 

Living people
1968 births
A New Era politicians
Members of the National Assembly (Venezuela)
21st-century Venezuelan politicians
21st-century Venezuelan women politicians

People from Aragua